is the seventh studio album by Japanese jazz fusion band T-Square, who was then known as The Square. It was released on May 21, 1983.

Track listing
Sources

References

T-Square (band) albums
1983 albums